Sărăteni or Sărăţeni may refer to the following places:

Romania
Sărățeni, Mureș, a commune in Mureș County, Romania
Castra of Sărățeni, a Roman fort in Mureș
Sărățeni, Ialomița
Sărăţeni, a village administered by Murgeni town, Vaslui County

Moldova
 Sărăteni, Leova, a commune in Leova district
 Sărăteni, a village in Cotul Morii Commune, Hînceşti district
 Sărătenii Noi, a village in Ratuș Commune, Teleneşti district
 Sărătenii Vechi, a commune in Teleneşti district

See also 
 Sarata (disambiguation)
 Sărata (disambiguation)
 Sărățel (disambiguation)
 Sărulești (disambiguation)